Dariusz Rekosz (born 11 April 1970 Sosnowiec, Poland) is a Polish author of books for children and teenagers, including Mors, Pinky, and the Secret of the Headmaster Fiszer, which began the series of “Mors, Pinky and...”.

Rekosz has also written Jan Matejko Code, a Polish parody of The Da Vinci Code. He has won a competition for Gdansk Crime Stories for his short story entitled The Secret of Neptune.

References
 "Mors, Pinky and the Secret of the Headmaster Fiszer" (2007)
 "Mors, Pinky and the Missing Flag" (2007)
 "Mors, Pinky and the Thirteenth Chamber" (2007)
 "Mors, Pinky and Archive of Colonel Bergman" (2008)
 "Jan Matejko Code" (2007)
 "Jan Matejko Code 2– (S)pace door-colony" (2008)
 "Detective couple - Jacek and Barbara (I) - A Mysterious Wardrobe" (2007)
 "Detective couple - Jacek and Barbara (II) - The Thief, Which Was Not" (2007)
 "Detective couple - Jacek and Barbara (III) - Where Are the Keys?" ( 2007 )
 "The Secret of Neptune" (story in the anthology "The Secret of Neptune. Gdansk Crime Stories", 2008)

External links
 Dariusz Rekosz - official page
 official page of Mors, Pinky i...
 oficjalna strona książki Szyfr Jana Matejki
 official page of MAMA, TATA... & MYSELF?

Polish male writers
1970 births
Living people